Zhujiajian Island is a national park located in Zhoushan, Zhejiang Province, China. It is the 5th largest island among the thousands in the Zhoushan Island Complex.

References

National parks of China
Zhejiang